Maud Mulder (born 17 November 1981 in Nijmegen, Netherlands) is a Dutch singer who rose to popularity after placing second in Idols Netherlands 2, the Dutch version of Pop Idol, shown by RTL 4.  She is also a professional field hockey player with hoofdklasse side NMHC Nijmegen.

On 12 March 2006, Mulder participated in the national Dutch Song Contest finals. However, the jury considered the three songs she performed to be without any potential for the Eurovision, since they were like many of The Netherlands' previous (unsuccessful) entries. Apart from that, her vocal performances were weak due to an inflammation of the throat. Maud became third out of three, only just beat by rock band Behave.

Idols performances
Top 27: White Flag by Dido
Top 10: Just Like A Pill by Pink
Top 9: Signed Sealed Delivered I'm Yours by Stevie Wonder
Top 8: Don't Say That You Love Me by Trijntje Oosterhuis
Top 7: Blame It On The Boogie by The Jackson 5
Top 6: Afscheid by Volumia!
Top 5: This Is How We Do It by Montell Jordan
Top 5: Dancing In The Street by Martha & The Vandellas
Top 4: Making Whoopee by Frank Sinatra
Top 4: Are You Gonna Go My Way? by Lenny Kravitz
Top 3: Thank You by Dido
Top 3: Ain't No Sunshine by Bill Withers
Top 3: Hole In The Head by Sugababes
Grand Final: Dancing In The Street by Martha & The Vandellas
Grand Final: When You Think Of Me by Mark Wills

Discography
 Idols Netherlands 2: Greatest Moments
 Wacht Op Mij
 Zoals Je Naar Me Kijkt
 Omdat Je Bij Me Blijft
 Jou/Moe

External links
 Official Site
 Unofficial Site

1981 births
Living people
Dutch pop singers
Dutch female field hockey players
People from Nijmegen
Idols (franchise) participants
21st-century Dutch singers
21st-century Dutch women singers
NMHC Nijmegen players